is a trans-Neptunian object, both considered a scattered and detached object, located in the outermost region of the Solar System. It was first observed on 17 March 2013, by a team of astronomers at the Cerro Tololo Inter-American Observatory in Chile. It orbits the Sun in a moderate inclined, moderate-eccentricity orbit.

Orbit and classification 

 orbits the Sun at a distance of 45.8–80.1 AU once every 499 years and 5 months (182,422 days; semi-major axis of 62.95 AU). Its orbit has an eccentricity of 0.27 and an inclination of 26° with respect to the ecliptic.

Considered both a scattered and detached object,  is particularly unusual as it has a relatively circular orbit for a scattered-disc object (SDO). Although it is thought that typical SDOs have been ejected into their current orbits by gravitational interactions with Neptune, the low eccentricity of its orbit and the distance of its perihelion (SDOs generally have highly eccentric orbits and perihelia less than 38 AU) seems hard to reconcile with such celestial mechanics. This has led to some uncertainty as to the current theoretical understanding of the outer Solar System. The theories include close stellar passages, unseen planet/rogue planets/planetary embryos in the early Kuiper belt, and resonance interaction with an outward-migrating Neptune. The Kozai mechanism is capable of transferring orbital eccentricity to a higher inclination.

Physical characteristics 

A survey for objects beyond the Kuiper Cliff by Scott Sheppard, Chadwick Trujillo and David Tholen gives a diameter of 250 kilometers assuming a moderate albedo of 0.10. Johnston's archive estimates a diameter of 280 kilometers based on an assumed albedo of 0.09, while American astronomer Michael Brown, calculates a diameter of 266 kilometers, using an estimated albedo of 0.08 and an absolute magnitude of 6.3.

On his website, Brown lists this object as a "possible" dwarf planet (200–400 km), which is the category with the lowest certainty in his 5-class taxonomic system. As of 2018, no spectral type and color indices, nor a rotational lightcurve have been obtained from spectroscopic and photometric observations. The body's color, rotation period, pole and shape remain unknown.

References

External links 
 List Of Centaurs and Scattered-Disk Objects, Minor Planet Center
 Discovery Circumstances: Numbered Minor Planets (1)–(5000) Minor Planet Center
 List of Known Trans-Neptunian Objects, Johnston's Archive
 
 

Minor planet object articles (unnumbered)

20130317